AvoDerm is a line of natural dog and cat food manufactured by Breeder's Choice Inc., of Irwindale, California. The company was founded by Harold Taylor in 1947.

The AvoDerm line was launched in 1982 as a specialty food for the alleviation of skin and coat problems in dogs. Eight of the brand's formulas include avocado meal to capitalize off its high levels of vitamins A, E, and C, as well as folate, potassium, niacin, and fatty acids. The food is also free of artificial preservatives. There is a vegetarian option.

It is recommended by Cheapism and Dog Food Advisor. It was recalled in 2012 for possible salmonella contamination.

References

External links

Cat food brands
Dog food brands
Companies based in Los Angeles County, California
Irwindale, California